The Black Hole Understands is the sixth studio album by Cloud Nothings. It was self-released on July 3, 2020.

Recording
The Black Hole Understands was recorded as live shows would not be happening for the foreseeable future due to the coronavirus. About a month into quarantine, Dylan Baldi and Jayson Gerycz starting sending files back and forth, with guitars, bass and vocals for the new songs recorded in Philadelphia, while drums and mixing took place in Cleveland. The album was mastered by Jack Callahan in New York City.

Release
The Black Hole Understands was released July 3, 2020 on Bandcamp.

Reception

Pitchfork stated, "Despite being recorded in an era of unthinkable instability, it is the most assuredly melodic Cloud Nothings has sounded in years" and that the band "make the dulled ennui of everyday life sound like an escapist fantasy". NME wrote, "Though much of lockdown has felt like the walls are closing in, the joyous The Black Hole Understands sees Cloud Nothings help us feel like we can bust right through them into a brighter future."

Track listing

References

2020 albums
Cloud Nothings albums